Micheál Breathnach (1886–?) was an Irish writer.

Born at Sylaun, Tuam, County Galway, the son of two teachers, raised as a Gaeilgeoir (a native-Irish speaker). he was educated by the Jesuits at Coláiste Iognáid, Galway, and later at Queen's University, Galway (now NUI Galway) where he graduated with a B.A. in Irish, French and English.

He taught in Dublin for over six years, and was awarded an M.A. In 1922 he was appointed a National School inspector and promoted to Assistant Chief Inspector of the Department of Education's Secondary Branch in 1932. In 1944 he was appointed Secretary of the Department of Education, holding that post till his retirement in 1953. He prepared a number of texts for the use of Secondary school students, and as the Irish public library movement held a particular interest, in 1954 he was appointed Chairman of the Library Council, An Chomhairle Leabharlanna. His autobiography, Cuimhne an tSeanpháiste was published in 1966.

Select bibliography
 Trom agus Eadtrom, Dublin, 1927.
 Fion na filidheachta, 1931.
 Pros na fiannaidheachta, 1932.
 Droidheacht Chaitlin, 1933.
 Cuimhne an tSeanpháiste, Dublin, 1966.

See also
 Breathnach

References

1886 births
20th-century deaths
Alumni of the University of Galway
People from Tuam
20th-century Irish writers
20th-century male writers